The pyramidion of Amenemhat III is the capstone that once crowned the Black Pyramid at Dashur, Egypt. Crafted around 1850 BC, towards the end of the 12th Dynasty during the Middle Kingdom, it remained mostly intact and is now located in the Egyptian Museum in Cairo.

Rediscovery 
In the year 1900, the then director of the Department of Antiquities Gaston Maspero had Dashur inspected, after the guards at the Saqqara necropolis were attacked by robbers. On the east side of the pyramid of Amenemhat, a grey block was found sticking out of the sand, which, upon closer inspection, was decorated with beautiful inscriptions. After excavation, the pyramidion was transported to the Egyptian Museum in Cairo.

Description 
The pyramidion, carved out of single piece of basalt (often called black granite), is mostly intact apart from a broken corner. The bottom edges are undercut to keep the block in position atop the pyramid.

Inscriptions 
The four upper faces were polished and inscribed. The side which pointed to the east is adorned with a winged sun disk flanked by two uraei. Below, two wedjat represent the eyes of the king himself. Further down, three nefer signs stand for beauty or perfection. Finally, a sun disk represents the god Ra, from which the throne name of Amenemhat "Ni-maat-re" extends to the right and his personal name "Imen-em-hat" to the left. As a whole, the composition reads: "Amenemhat beholds the perfection of Ra".

Along the bottom of the four upper faces, two lines of inscriptions run. The eastern commences with: "Opened is the face of king Amenemhat, he observes the Lord of the Horizon crossing the sky", the northern with: "Higher is the soul (Ba) of king Amenemhat than the height of Orion, and it joins the Duat".

The name of the god Amen in Amenemhat's cartouches has been erased. If this was done during the reign of Akhenaten in the 18th Dynasty, the pyramidion may have laid on the ground since . The relative lack of damage raised the question whether or not it had ever been on top of the pyramid.

See also 
 List of Egyptian pyramidia

References

Bibliography 
 
 
 
 

Amenemhat III
Basalt
Egyptian Museum
1900 archaeological discoveries
Sacred rocks